Martz is a surname. It may refer to:

Austin Martz (born 1992), American soccer player
Charles S. Martz (1903–1966), American photographer, painter, inventor, and entrepreneur
Clyde O. Martz (1920–2010), American attorney and politician
Edward Ralph Martz (1930–2007), American actor
Edwin P. Martz (1916–1967), American physicist and astronomer
Gary Martz (born 1951), American baseball player
Hendrik Martz (born 1968), German actor
Íngrid Martz (born 1979), Mexican actor and model
Jasun Martz (born 1953), American musician and artist
Jennifer Martz (born 1977), American volleyball player
Joe Martz (born ?), American politician and civil servant
Judy Martz (1943–2017), American politician, businesswoman, speed skater, and Olympics competitor
Karl Martz (1912–1997), American studio potter, ceramist, and teacher
Lance Martz (Born 1969), American magazine editor, photographer, marketing consultant, animal rescue
Louis L. Martz (1913–2001), American English literature professor, library director, and writer
Mike Martz (born 1951), American football coach
Randy Martz (born 1956), American baseball player and coach
William Martz (1945–1983), American chess master

See also
Marz (surname), a similarly spelled surname

Surnames from nicknames
Surnames from given names